New Conservative Party may refer to:

 New Conservative Party (UK) 1960–1962
 New Conservative Party (Japan) 2000–2003
 New Conservative Party (New Zealand) 2011–current
 New Conservative Party (Latvia) 2014–current
 New Conservative Party (South Korea) 2019–2020

See also 
 Conservative Party (disambiguation)